Pagidipalli is a village in Bhuvanagiri Mandal & Municipality of Yadadri Bhuvanagiri district of Telangana, India. It has a railway station named the Pagidipalli railway station.

References

Villages in Nalgonda district